Dyspnoi is a suborder of harvestmen, currently comprising 43 extant genera and 356 extant species, although more species are expected to be described in the future. The eight families are currently grouped into three superfamilies: the Acropsopilionoidea, Ischyropsalidioidea, and Troguloidea.

Distribution
The Dyspnoi are one of the most biogeographically conserved higher groups of harvestmen. With the exception of Acropsopilioidea, none occur in the Southern Hemisphere, and most families are restricted along temperate regions. The only exceptions are some Ortholasmatinae (Nemastomatidae) inhabiting the tropics on high mountains in Mexico (Ortholasma bolivari) and northern Thailand (Dendrolasma angka).

Systematics

Acropsopilionoidea
Acropsopilionidae (3 genera, 19 species)
Ischyropsalidoidea
Ischyropsalidoidea Incertae sedis
Crosbycus dasycnemus
Hesperonemastoma (5 species)
Ischyropsalididae
Ceratolasmatinae (2 genera, 8 species)
Ischyropsalidinae (1 genus, 23 species)
Sabaconidae (1 genus, 57 species)
Taracidae (2 genera, 17 species)
Troguloidea
Dicranolasmatidae (1 genus, 16 species)
Nemastomatidae
Nemastomatinae (18 genera, 123 species)
Ortholasmatinae (7 genera, 27 species)
Nipponopsalididae (1 genus, 3 species)
Trogulidae (5 genera, 57 species)
†Halithersidae monotypic, Burmese amber, Myanmar, Cenomanian

References

Harvestmen
Arthropod suborders